A Painting of Roses is a short documentary by Miguel Ribeiro.

It was produced in 2003 by Bookcase, an independent Portuguese film company.

Festival and awards
 Café das Imagens, Videoteca de Lisboa, 2003
 Mostra de Vídeo Português, Videoteca de Lisboa, 2004
 XI Caminhos do Cinema Português, Coimbra, 2004
Best documentary - video category
 Art Festival at Palazzo Venezia – International Exhibition of Art films and Documentaries, Roma, 2004
 X Festival Internacional de Cinema e Vídeo de Ambiente da Serra da Estrela, Seia, 2004
 FIKE, Festival Internacional de Curtas-Metragens de Évora, 2004
 IMAGO, V Festival Internacional de Cinema e vídeo Jovem, Fundão, 2004
 Pärnu International Documentary and Anthropology Film Festival, Estónia, 2004
 Jovens Criadores 2004, Clube Português de Artes e Ideias, 2004
 71st MIFED, - International Cinema and Multimedia Market, Milão, 2004
Award EMERGING EUROPEAN FILMMAKERS
NOVIDAD Film Fest, Covilhã, 2004
Best documentary
 IX Festival Internacional de Curtas-metragens de Teerão, 2004
 Jornadas  lugar d’arte- mostra de vídeo, cine-teatro Baltazar Dias, Funchal, 2005
 VI European Cinema Festival. Lecce, 2005
 XII Bienal de Jovens Criadores da Europa e do Mediterrâneo, Nápoles, 2005
 V Mostra Audiovisual "El Mes + Corto", Cáceres, Badajoz, Evora e Lisboa, 2006

External links
 
 MIFED 

Portuguese documentary films
2004 films